Detour is a 2016 British thriller film written and directed by Christopher Smith. The film stars Tye Sheridan, Stephen Moyer, Emory Cohen, Bel Powley, John Lynch, Gbenga Akinnagbe and Reine Swart. The film was released in the United States on 20 January 2017 by Magnet Releasing.

Plot
Young law student Harper blames his powerful stepfather Vincent for causing the car accident that put his mother in a coma. One evening in a bar he drinks with the professional criminal Johnny Ray, who agrees to kill his stepfather for $20,000. Johnny Ray and his girlfriend Cherry arrive the next morning to take Harper to Vegas to carry out the murder. The trip to Las Vegas becomes a battle of wits and determination between Johnny Ray, who has debts to pay along the way, and Harper, who seeks to conceal his own crimes and to escape from Johnny Ray with Cherry.

Cast
Tye Sheridan as Harper
Stephen Moyer as Vincent
Emory Cohen as Johnny Ray
Bel Powley as Cherry
John Lynch as Frank
 Jared Abrahamson as Paul
Gbenga Akinnagbe as Michael
Reine Swart as Claire Wiseman

Release
The film premiered at the Tribeca Film Festival on 16 April 2016. On 14 May 2016, Magnet Releasing acquired distribution rights to the film, which it released in the United States on 20 January 2017.

Response

Box office
Detour grossed $1,788 in the United States and Canada and $5,812 in other territories for a worldwide total of $7,600, plus $374,237 with home video sales.

Critical reception
, on review aggregator website Rotten Tomatoes, the film holds an approval rating of 65% based on 31 reviews, with an average rating of 6.03/10. On Metacritic, the film holds a rating of 46 out of 100, based on 7 critics, indicating "mixed or average reviews".

References

External links
  
 
 

2016 films
British nonlinear narrative films
British thriller films
2010s English-language films
English-language South African films
Films about murder
Films directed by Christopher Smith
Films set in the Las Vegas Valley
Films set in Mexico
South African thriller films
2016 thriller films
2010s British films